The Olympic Archery Field, Joliette was a field located in Joliette, Quebec. Approved in 1974 by the International Archery Federation (FITA) for use, it hosted the archery competitions for the 1976 Summer Olympics.

The site is still in use today. It is run by the Club de Tir à l'Arc de Joliette. The address of the site is: 1505 Boulevard Base-de-Roc,
Joliette QC.

References
1976 Summer Olympics official report. Volume 2. pp. 190–3.

Venues of the 1976 Summer Olympics
Olympic archery venues
Defunct sports venues in Canada
Sports venues in Quebec
Joliette
1974 establishments in Quebec